John Rennie Blake was the faculty chairman in charge of Davidson College from 1871 to 1877.

After the death of George Wilson McPhail, the position of president was vacated as the college opted to elect a faculty member, Blake, to oversee the college until Andrew Dousa Hepburn was appointed in 1877. Because Blake was not an ordained minister, he was ineligible to become president according to the college's constitution. It was during his tenure that Woodrow Wilson and Robert Broadnax Glenn enrolled as students.

References

External links 
 Biography from the Davidson College Archives & Special Collections

1825 births
1900 deaths
Presidents of Davidson College
People from Greenwood, South Carolina
University of Georgia alumni
Harvard School of Engineering and Applied Sciences alumni